The Malvern School, founded in 1998, is a year-round private preschool for ages six weeks to eight years. The school has 27 locations throughout Southeastern Pennsylvania and Central and Southern New Jersey.

History
Joseph Scandone and Kristen Waterfield founded the Malvern School in 1998. Scandone also founded the Goddard School in 1986. Scandone served as president and CEO until 1996. Malvern currently operates schools in Pennsylvania and New Jersey.

Mrs. Bush’s Story Time
In 2010, the Malvern School hosted a school-wide event based on First Lady Barbara Bush’s pro-literacy radio program "Mrs. Bush’s Story Time," which featured celebrities reading classic children’s stories. Bush said, "I am especially pleased that the Malvern School is using the broadcasts as educational events for their students, and I wish them the best of luck.”

Alex’s Lemonade Stand Foundation
Since 2008, The Malvern School has been a sponsor of The Alex Scott – Stand for Hope Phone Bank on CBS 3-Philadelphia and the Alex's Lemonade Stand Foundation (ALSF) by raising funds and awareness for pediatric cancer. Every year since 2008, each Malvern School location hosts an Alex's Lemonade Stand Day.

As of 2018, The Malvern School had raised nearly $800,000 for Alex's and has been recognized by ALSF as one of the top 100 individual fundraisers for the foundation in the Pennsylvania/New Jersey area.

References

External links

http://bushlibrary.tamu.edu/education/programs.php#programs
http://educationviews.org
http://www.naeyc.org/files/academy/file/AllCriteriaDocument.pdf
http://www.phoenixvillenews.com
http://www.naeyc.org/files/academy/file/AllCriteriaDocument.pdf

Education in Pennsylvania
Education in New Jersey
Preschools in the United States
Early childhood education
1998 establishments in Pennsylvania